Centennial High School is a public high school located in Blaine, Minnesota, United States. The mailing address uses the Circle Pines, Minnesota Post office. The school services students in the 9th through 12th grade in the cities of Lexington, Blaine, Centerville, Lino Lakes and Circle Pines, as part of the Centennial School District.

Included on campus are a sports arena for indoor soccer and hockey, football and track field, several baseball and softball diamonds, soccer fields, and an indoor swimming pool.  There are three pay-to-park lots for students who use their own vehicles to travel to school.

As of the 201415 school year, the school had an enrollment of 1,994 students and 97.5 classroom teachers (on an FTE basis), for a student–teacher ratio of 20.5:1. There were 199 students (10.0% of enrollment) eligible for free lunch and 89 (4.5% of students) eligible for reduced-cost lunch.

Courses
Centennial offers a wide variety of courses, including Psychology, Sociology, Honors Botany, Honors Zoology, Photography, Video Production, Anatomy and Physiology, multiple PLTW classes, Architectural Drafting, Interior Design, Marketing, AP classes, CIS classes, 21st Century Law, and Commercial Graphic Design.

Sports
Sports offered by the school include cheerleading, swimming, soccer, basketball, volleyball, cross country, downhill skiing, tennis, hockey, football, wrestling, baseball, softball, lacrosse, track, and gymnastics.  In 1995, Centennial retired their former name (Centennial Chiefs) and replaced it with the Centennial Cougars.

Dance team
The dance team has been coached by Sarah Austin for 10 years. Raplhie Ermantraut started the team in 1958. The team competes in high kick and jazz competitions and invitationals. Competitions held for varsity and junior varsity levels. The team participated in the state competition in 2009, 2011, 2012, 2015, 2016, and 2017.

Boys' hockey
The 2004 boys hockey team finished the season with a 30−1−0 record, and won their first ever state championship by shutting out Academy of Holy Angels (2-0), Wayzata High School (3-0), and Moorhead High School (1−0) in the state championship in their first-ever appearance. The team won their championship over Moorhead in front of a crowd of more than 17,000 at the Xcel Energy Center, home of the NHL Minnesota Wild. This marked the first time a goalie has ever carried a shutout throughout an entire state tournament in its 60-year history. Four players were named to the Class AA All-Tournament Team.

Girls' basketball
In 2009, the girls' basketball team made it to the finals with a 29−3 record and placed second to Minneapolis South.

Wrestling
The Centennial wrestling team qualified for the state tournament in '00−'01, '01−'02, '02−'03, ' 04−'05, '05−'06, '07−'08, and '08−'09. In 01−02, the team ousted Owatonna 30−27 to reach the state finals, eventually falling to Apple Valley High School, 50−12 to take 2nd place in the state.

Controversies
In March 2021, an Asian-American student released screenshots of two students sending her racist text messages. A walkout protest on March 29th, 2021 took place, where students voiced their concerns about racism at the school.

Notable alumni
 Chris Anderson (2010) - baseball player drafted in the first round of the 2013 MLB draft by the Los Angeles Dodgers, currently with the AA Tulsa Drillers
 Tyler Pitlick (2009) - National Hockey League player with the Dallas Stars, selected by the Edmonton Oilers in the 2nd round (31st overall) of the 2010 NHL Entry Draft
 Kye Allums (2008) - former George Washington University basketball player, first openly transgender player in NCAA history
 Kaitlin Young (2004) - professional mixed martial artist
 Tracie McBride (1993) - United States Army soldier who was kidnapped, raped and murdered on February 18, 1995.
 Dave Dahl (1972) - KSTP meteorologist

References

External links

 

Educational institutions established in 1958
Public high schools in Minnesota
Schools in Anoka County, Minnesota
1958 establishments in Minnesota